Kelshall is a small village in North East Hertfordshire, England. It is near the town of Royston. It has a village hall and the local church is St Faith's. Kelshall is also the name of the civil parish. Kelshall also has a major road running along one of its boundaries.
In the 1880s the church was described as being "ancient, plain, and good, with a tower; and contains a few brasses and monuments".

The Kelshall Hoard
In April 2015, North Hertfordshire District Council announced that a Roman copper-alloy jug had been discovered in a field in Kelshall by a metal detectorist in late 2014. A subsequent archaeological dig found a Roman grave, which contained a number of other artefacts believed to date to between 205 and 215AD, including a silver denarius of Trajan, three 2nd century copper-alloy coins, a quantity of Roman glass, including bottles, glasses and two polychrome dishes thought to have been made in Roman Alexandria. In 2017, Ian Richardson, the treasure registrar for the Portable Antiquities Scheme, judged the dishes to be amongst the five most significant finds of recent years. The artefacts were bought by the North Hertfordshire Museum.

Governance
Kelshall has three tiers of local government at parish, district and county level: Kelshall Parish Meeting, North Hertfordshire District Council, and Hertfordshire County Council.

Kelshall is an ancient parish, and it was part of the hundred of Odsey. Kelshall was included in the Royston Poor Law Union from 1835. The Local Government Act 1894 created parish and district councils. Kelshall was included in Ashwell Rural District from 28 December 1894. Despite the name, Ashwell Rural District Council was based in the town of Royston. Kelshall's population was too small to be given a parish council, and so the Kelshall Parish Meeting was established on 4 December 1894 to take over the secular functions of the parish vestry. Ashwell Rural District was abolished in 1935, becoming part of Hitchin Rural District, which in turn was abolished in 1974, becoming part of North Hertfordshire.

Economy

According to the 2011 Census, there are 87 economically active people in Kelshall, aged between 16–74. Only 22.3% of the total population is made up of full-time employees. There are 24 retired people, which make up 19.8% of the population.

According to the 2011 Census, 44 of the economically active people are males. 43 of these are female. "The rate of unemployment in Kelshall is both lower than the average for Hertfordshire and lower than the national average, suggesting that finding a job in this area may be easier than other places"

Industry
The number of people in Kelshall that are in manufacturing is 9, (10.8%), compared to 1 person working in Real Estate Activities (1.2%) and 5 people working in Financial and Insurance Activities (6.0). There are many different industries in Kelshall, "The parish is mainly agricultural, the chief crops being wheat, oats and roots, and only a small proportion of the land is laid down to pasture".

Travel
There are many key destinations that are accessible from Kelshall, using their local bus service, these are Royston, Hitchin and Letchworth. "The village lies about 2 miles to the south of the Icknield way, with which it is connected by roads leading north, joining in the village and thence going to Therfield and the Ermine Street at Buckland". There is also a road that leads to Buckland and this is where the main part of the village is actually situated.

Population

The population of Kelshall, on average, is actually older than the average age of Hertfordshire, also "The population of Kelshall as a whole, is older than the national average"

As the graph shows, the population had increased from 1801 when it was 179 to the year 1851 when it was 326 and this was the peak population of Kelshall within this time period. From this year it then slowly decreased and the lowest the population stood at was 122 in 1961.
According to the 2001 census, the population stood at 151. 79 of these people were married and that was their first marriage. 43 people were single and had never been married, while 9 people had been remarried. The 2011 census shows a population of 163.

Religion
As the graph shows, in 2001 there were 124 Christians in Kelshall. This group of people made up 82% of the population. This then decreased in 2011 as the number of Christians then was only 119, representing 73% of the population. From 2001–11 the number of Muslims increased from 0–2 and the number of non-religious people also experienced some change. In 2001 this number stood at 17, this means that this group of people made up 11% of the population at the time. This then increased in 2011 to 28 people, which was then 17% of the population.

St. Faith's Church
St.Faith's Church was restored thoroughly from 1868–70. It is situated on the edge of the village and the ceilings are painted in a medieval style, which was done recently. The south door is also described as being "contemporary". "Several small ponds lie on the east of the church, and from the formation of the ground it appears probable that there was once a moat here".

References

External links

Kelshall Parish

Villages in Hertfordshire
Civil parishes in Hertfordshire
Roman sites in Hertfordshire